The European Video Corporation, also known as EVC, is a European home video distribution company. They have released various low-budget films on VHS, VCC, and Betamax, ranging in year from 1949 to 1986. Their home media films have been released in the Netherlands and Belgium.

Films released
 Abbott and Costello in Africa Screams (1949)
 Tulsa (1949)
 Hercules in the Haunted World (1961)
 Maciste all'inferno (1962)
 Octaman (1971)
 Tombs of the Blind Dead (1971)
 Tales of Canterbury (1973)
 Die Stoßburg (1974)
 The Alien Factor (1976) 
 Cola, Candy, Chocolate (1979)
 The Great Alligator (1979)
 Alien 2: On Earth (1980)
 City of the Living Dead (1980)
 White Cannibal Queen (1980)
 The Final Countdown (1980)
 Scanners (1981)
 Zen Kwan Do Strikes Paris (1981) 
 Caged Fury (1983)
 Enigma (1982)
 The blue-eyed Bandit aka Il Bandito dagli Occhi Azzurri (1982)
 Blood Simple (1984)
 Once Upon a Time in America (1984)
 Yellow Hair and the Fortress of Gold (1984)
 Almost You (1985)
 Sloane (1986)

References

Home video distributors